Sowmiya Narayanasamy (born 25 July 2000) is an Indian women's international footballer who plays for Gokulam Kerala and the India women's national football team.

Career 
Sowmiya won first trophy of her club career with Sethu FC in 2019 Indian Women's League season.

Honours

India
 SAFF Women's Championship: 2019

Sethu FC
Indian Women's League: 2018–19

Tamil Nadu
 National Games Bronze medal: 2022

References

External links 
 Sowmiya Narayanasamy at All India Football Federation
 

2000 births
Living people
People from Salem, Tamil Nadu
Footballers from Tamil Nadu
Sportswomen from Tamil Nadu
Indian women's footballers
India women's international footballers
India women's youth international footballers
Sethu FC players
Gokulam Kerala FC Women players
Indian Women's League players
Women's association football goalkeepers